The Committee on Foreign Investment in the United States (CFIUS, commonly pronounced "Cifius" ) is an inter-agency committee of the United States government composed of nine cabinet-level officials, which reviews the national security implications of foreign investments in U.S. companies or operations using classified information from the United States Intelligence Community. 

Chaired by the United States secretary of the treasury, CFIUS includes representatives from 16 U.S. departments and agencies, including the Defense, State and Commerce departments, as well as (most recently) the Department of Homeland Security.

CFIUS was first established by President Gerald Ford's  in 1975, initially to study foreign investment. But in the 1980s, fear of Japanese investment (and in particular a proposed purchase of Fairchild Semiconductor by Fujitsu) led Congress to pass the Exon–Florio Amendment in 1988, which empowered CFIUS to reject deals. CFIUS is further codified under law via Section 721 of the Defense Production Act under Foreign Investment and National Security Act of 2007. CFIUS does not acknowledge which deals are under review, does not require the involvement of any of the parties of a deal, and does not publicly announce its findings. There is no statute of limitations for CFIUS to exert jurisdiction over a transaction. Companies/persons that failed to make an appropriate filing for old and/or new transactions may result in a penalty if done so in gross negligence or intent to evade the law.

Process
All companies proposing to be involved in an acquisition by a foreign firm are supposed to voluntarily notify CFIUS, but CFIUS can review transactions that are not voluntarily submitted.

CFIUS' primary concern in most reviews is that technology or funds from an acquired U.S. business might be transferred to a sanctioned country as a result of being acquired by a foreign acquirer.

CFIUS reviews begin with a 45-day decision to authorize a transaction or begin a statutory investigation. If the latter is chosen, the committee has another 45 days to decide whether to permit the acquisition or order divestment. Most transactions submitted to CFIUS are approved without the statutory investigation. However, in 2012 about 40% of the 114 cases submitted to CFIUS proceeded to investigation.

CFIUS provides close scrutiny to acquisitions of critical infrastructure, including public health or telecommunications, among others.

CFIUS has looked at the "restrictions on sale of advanced computers to any of a long list of foreign recipients, ranging from China to Iran." CFIUS reviews even deals with firms from U.S. allies, such as BAE Systems' early-2005 acquisition of United Defense. This and the vast majority of transactions submitted to CFIUS are approved without difficulty. But at least one deal has been called off when CFIUS began to take a closer look.

History 
It was composed of the secretary of the treasury as the chairman, secretary of state, secretary of defense, secretary of commerce, the assistant to the president for economic affairs, and the executive director of the Council on Foreign Economic Policy. The executive order also stipulated that the committee would have "primary continuing responsibility within the Executive Branch for monitoring the impact of foreign investment in the United States, both direct and portfolio, and for coordinating the implementation of United States policy on such investment." In particular, CFIUS was directed to:
 arrange for the preparation of analyses of trends and significant developments in foreign investments in the United States;
 provide guidance on arrangements with foreign governments for advance consultations on prospective major foreign governmental investments in the United States;
 review investments in the United States which, in the judgment of the committee, might have major implications for United States national interests; and
 consider proposals for new legislation or regulations relating to foreign investment as may appear necessary.

In 1988, the Exon–Florio Amendment was the result of national security concerns in Congress caused by the proposed purchase of Fairchild Semiconductor by Fujitsu. The Exon-Florio Amendment granted the president the authority to block proposed mergers, acquisitions, and takeovers that threaten national security. Reagan also delegated the review process to the Committee on Foreign Investment in the United States in the same executive order, utilizing the statutory authority the U.S. Congress enacted to enable the president to review foreign investments, in the form of Exon-Florio Amendment.

In 1992, the Byrd Amendment required CFIUS to investigate proposed mergers, acquisitions, and takeovers where the acquirer is acting on behalf of a foreign government and affects national security.

The Foreign Investment and National Security Act of 2007 (FINSA) established the committee by statutory authority, reduced membership to six cabinet members and the attorney general, added the secretary of labor and the director of national intelligence, and removed seven White House appointees. In 2008, President Bush added the United States trade representative and the director of the Office of Science and Technology Policy by  implementing the law. FINSA requires the president to conduct a national security investigation of certain proposed investment transactions, provides a broader oversight role for Congress, and keeps the president as the only officer with the authority to suspend or prohibit mergers, acquisitions, and takeovers.

In 2018, President Donald Trump signed the Foreign Investment Risk Review Modernization Act (FIRRMA), which granted CFIUS new powers over particular types of FDI that mainly concern Chinese investors. These include real estate investing, areas where minority investment through private equity provide access to US tech companies' business information, and US-Chinese joint ventures. CFIUS also gained more appropriations, staffing, authority to enforce a longer review period, and formalizes more thorough material agreement disclosure.

In September 2022, President Joe Biden signed an executive order directing CFIUS to sharpen its scrutiny of foreign investment that could impact cyber security, quantum computing, biotechnology, and sensitive data. The Committee has been noted in the press as quickly gaining importance and attention in the national security world, with the New York Times calling it "powerful and unseen."

Opinions on the committee 
Press reports have repeatedly criticized CFIUS for its secrecy, referring to the Committee's investigations as a "black box." Advocates for its current level of confidentiality argue that there are few alternatives, as CFIUS's work is based on classified national security information, which cannot be disclosed to the public. 

In February 2006, Richard Perle gave his opinion on CFIUS when he related to CBS News his experience with the panel during the Reagan administration: "The committee almost never met, and when it deliberated it was usually at a fairly low bureaucratic level." He also added, "I think it's a bit of a joke if we were serious about scrutinizing foreign ownership and foreign control, particularly since 9/11."

Others emphasize the crucial role that foreign direct investment plays in the U.S. economy, and the discouraging effect that heightened scrutiny may cause. Foreign investors in the United States, much like U.S. investors elsewhere, bring expertise and infusions of capital into often-struggling sectors of the U.S. economy. In a February 2006 interview with the New York Times, another former Reagan administration official, Clyde V. Prestowitz Jr., noted that the United States "need[s] a net inflow of capital of $3 billion a day to keep the economy afloat. ... Yet all of the body language here is 'go away.

Notable cases
 1990: President George H. W. Bush voided the sale of MAMCO Manufacturing to a Chinese agency, ordering China National Aero-Technology Import & Export Corporation to divest themselves of Seattle-based MAMCO
 2000: Japanese NTT Communications' acquisition of Verio
 2005: The acquisition of IBM's personal computer and laptop unit by Lenovo
 2005: The acquisition of Sequoia Voting Systems of Oakland, California, by Smartmatic, a Dutch company contracted by Hugo Chávez's government to replace that country's elections machinery
 2005: In June 2005 a CNOOC Group (a major Chinese state-owned oil and gas corporation) subsidiary (CNOOC limited, publicly listed on the New York NYSE and Hong Kong stock exchanges) made an $18.5 billion cash offer for American oil company Unocal Corporation, topping an earlier bid by ChevronTexaco. While this offer was not opposed by the CFIUS and the Bush Administration, it was criticized by several Congressmen and, following a vote in the United States House of Representatives, the bid was referred to President George W. Bush, on the grounds that its implications for national security needed to be reviewed. On July 20, 2005 Unocal Corporation announced that it had accepted a buyout offer from ChevronTexaco for $17.1 billion, which was submitted to Unocal stockholders on August 10. On August 2 CNOOC Limited announced that it had withdrawn its bid, citing political tensions in the United States.
 2006: State-owned Dubai Ports World's planned acquisition of P&O, the lessee and operator of many terminals, mostly for container ships, in several ports, including in New York-New Jersey and others in the US. This acquisition was initially approved by the CFIUS and then President G.W. Bush, but was eventually opposed by Congress (Dubai Ports World controversy).
 2010: Russian interests acquired a controlling interest in Uranium One, which has 20 percent of U.S. uranium extraction capacity. The Nuclear Regulatory Commission approved the deal because Uranium One only has a license for uranium recovery, not uranium export.  
 2012: Ralls Corporation, owned by the Chinese Sany Group, was ordered by President Barack Obama to divest itself of four small wind farm projects located too close to a U.S. Navy weapons systems training facility in Boardman, Oregon.
 2016: President Obama blocked the buying by a Chinese company of the U.S. assets of the German company Aixtron SE. Separately, the New York Times reported that "United States officials blocked" a $2.6 billion deal by Philips to sell Lumileds division to GO Scale Capital and GRS Ventures over concerns regarding Chinese applications of gallium nitride.
 2017: President Trump blocked the acquisition by a Chinese purchaser of Lattice Semiconductor.
 2018: President Trump blocked Singapore-based Broadcom Limited from purchasing Qualcomm in a hostile takeover, citing national security concerns raised by CFIUS.
 2019: CFIUS requested that Chinese gaming company Beijing Kunlun Tech Co Ltd. sell Grindr, citing national security concerns regarding a database of user's location, messages, and HIV status, after the company acquired the gay dating app in 2018 without CFIUS review. A deadline for the sale has been set for June 2020.
 2020: President Trump threatened to ban TikTok, but in August declared a September 15 deadline for a sale to an American company. TikTok successfully challenged the ban, and the Biden administration asked to delay the government's appeal of a federal district court judge's December injunction against the TikTok ban as President Biden undertakes a broad review of his predecessor's efforts to address potential security risks from Chinese tech companies.

Notifications and investigations 

CFIUS Notifications and Investigations, 1988–2018

See also
 Title 31 of the Code of Federal Regulations

References

External links

 CFIUS page at US Treasury

United States federal boards, commissions, and committees
United States trade policy
1975 establishments in the United States
Investment in the United States